The Galoli, or Galolen, are a people of East Timor with a population of about 50,000, primarily along the northern coast of the district of Manatuto. To the west lies the Mambai people. There is an old colony on the southern coast of Wetar island, the Talo, who speak the Talur dialect.

Their language, also known as Galoli, is one of the Timor–Babar group of Austronesian languages. It is one of the national languages designated by the constitution of East Timor. Because the area was used as a trading center for different cultures, there are many foreign loan words in the vocabulary, principally from Moluccan and Malay languages. Although it is not spoken by as many people as other national languages, it was adopted by the Roman Catholic Church in the district of Manatuto and thus has become fixed in grammars and dictionaries.

Dadu'a is erroneously listed in some sources as a dialect of Galoli (e.g. Glottolog), but actually represents a transplanted population of the Atauro dialect of Wetarese.

Alphabet
A B D E G H I K L M N O R S T U ' 

The  '  mark represents a glottal stop, [ʔ].

References

External links 
 Paradisec open access short description of Galoli
 Paradisec open access Galoli texts
 Paradisec open access Galoli phrases

Timor–Babar languages
Languages of East Timor
Languages of Indonesia